Phi Piscium, Latinized from φ Piscium, is a quadruple star system approximately 380 light years away in the constellation Pisces. It consists of Phi Piscium A, with a spectral type of K0III, and Phi Piscium B. Phi Piscium A possesses a surface temperature of 3,500 to 5,000 kelvins. Some suggest the only visible companion in the Phi Piscium B sub-system is a late F dwarf star, while others suggest it is a K0 star. The invisible component of the Phi Piscium B sub-system is proposed to have a spectral type of M2V. The star system has a period of about 20½ years and has a notably high eccentricity of 0.815.

Naming

References

K-type giants
Spectroscopic binaries
4

Pisces (constellation)
Piscium, Phi
Piscium, 085
007318
005742
0360
Durchmusterung objects